Asadabad-e Anguri (also Romanized as Asadābād-e Āngūrī) is a village in Chahdegal Rural District, Negin Kavir District, Fahraj County, Kerman Province, Iran. At the 2006 census, its population was 1,041, in 225 families.

References 

Populated places in Fahraj County